Spintharus greerae is a species of comb-footed spider in the family Theridiidae. It is found in Mexico. It is one of 15 new species described in 2018.

References

Theridiidae
Spiders described in 2018
Spiders of Mexico